Ozren may refer to:

 Places
 Ozren (Bosnia and Herzegovina), a mountain in northern Bosnia
 Ozren Monastery, near Mount Ozren
 Ozren (Ilijaš), a village in the municipality of Ilijaš, Bosnia and Herzegovina
 Ozren (Pešter), a mountain in southwestern Serbia
 Ozren (Sokobanja), a mountain in eastern Serbia
 Sarajevo's Ozren, a mountain near Sarajevo, Bosnia and Herzegovina

 People
 Ozren Bonačić (born 1942), Croatian water polo player who competed in the 1964 and 1968 Summer Olympic Games
 Ozren Nedeljković (190384), Serbian chessplayer
 Ozren Nedoklan (19222004), Yugoslav footballer and manager
 Ozren Grabarić (born 1980), Croatian actor
 Ozren Perić (born 1987), Bosnian Serb footballer
 Organisations
 FK Ozren (disambiguation), several football clubs

See also